David Arthur Whitaker (18 April 1928 – 4 February 1980) was an English television writer and novelist who worked on the early years of the science-fiction TV series Doctor Who. He served as the programme's first story editor, supervising the writing of its first 51 episodes from 1963 to 1964.

Career

Prior to joining the BBC, Whitaker worked as a writer, actor and director with the York Repertory Group.  A play he wrote for them, 'A Choice of Partners' (1957), gained the attention of the BBC's script department. They commissioned Whitaker to work on the programmes Garry Halliday (1962) and the long-running Compact (1962).

Whitaker also contributed his own scripts for a number of Doctor Who serials, including The Crusade (1965), The Power of the Daleks (1966), The Evil of the Daleks (1967), The Enemy of the World (1967–68) and The Wheel in Space (1968, from a story concept by Kit Pedler). Although he left the post of story editor in 1964 his final script for the show was The Ambassadors of Death (1970). He had not planned to stay longer than a year as Doctor Who's story editor, as he thought the serial might not be renewed.  He had therefore agreed to take up a role working on another production. 

His other work included writing the Dalek comic strip for the weekly children's magazine TV Century 21, in addition to the stage play The Curse of the Daleks (1965).

In 1964, Whitaker published the first novelisation of a Doctor Who serial; more than 150 other such books would be published in the course of the next 30 years. His own, Doctor Who in an Exciting Adventure with the Daleks, was based on Terry Nation's script for the first Dalek TV serial. He completed a second novelisation the following year, this time based on his own script for The Crusade. Both books were originally published by Frederick Muller, with the first also being given a paperback release by Armada. 

In 1973, Whitaker's novelisations (along with a third, written by Bill Strutton and based on The Web Planet) were re-issued by Target Books as part of its launch of a new series of novelisations; Whitaker's Dalek story was re-titled Doctor Who and the Daleks.

From 1966 to 1968 Whitaker was the chairman of the Writers Guild of Great Britain. He moved to Australia in the 70's and contributed to the series  "Homicide", "The Drifter" and "Elephant Boy" before returning to the UK.

Before his death in 1980, Whitaker had been undergoing treatment for cancer. He died leaving his novelisation of The Enemy of the World unfinished and his plans to adapt The Evil of the Daleks unrealised. The adaptation of The Enemy of the World was ultimately written by Ian Marter without using any of the material prepared by Whitaker, while The Evil of the Daleks was eventually novelised by John Peel and published in 1993.

List of Doctor Who credits

As writer (1963–69)
The Edge of Destruction
The Rescue
The Crusade
The Power of the Daleks (Patrick Troughton's first serial as the Second Doctor, with uncredited script re-writes by Dennis Spooner)
The Evil of the Daleks
The Enemy of the World (with uncredited re-writes by Barry Letts and Derrick Sherwin)
The Wheel in Space (from a story by Kit Pedler)
The Ambassadors of Death (with uncredited re-writes by Terrance Dicks, Trevor Ray and Malcolm Hulke)

Although tasked with writing the serial that would later be produced as The Invasion (1968), Whitaker was ultimately unable to contribute a script, leaving then-story editor and future Doctor Who producer Derrick Sherwin to write it himself.

As story editor (1963–64)
An Unearthly Child
The Daleks
The Edge of Destruction
Marco Polo
The Keys of Marinus
The Aztecs
The Sensorites
The Reign of Terror
Planet of Giants
The Dalek Invasion of Earth

References

Bibliography

External links

1928 births
1980 deaths
20th-century English novelists
BBC people
Deaths from cancer in England
English comics writers
English science fiction writers
English television writers
People from North Hertfordshire District
20th-century English dramatists and playwrights
British male dramatists and playwrights
English male novelists
20th-century English male writers
English male non-fiction writers
British male television writers
20th-century English screenwriters